Keith Franke (born November 13, 1970) is an American politician and former member of the Minnesota House of Representatives. A member of the Republican Party of Minnesota, he represented District 54A in the southeastern Twin Cities metropolitan area.

Early life, education, and career
Franke was born on November 13, 1970. He attended Saint Paul College, graduating with a certificate in restaurant and bar management, and Hamline University, graduating with a certificate in economic development.

Franke was mayor of St. Paul Park, Minnesota from 2012 to 2016. He was a member of the South Washington County Cable Commission, the Red Rock Corridor Commission, and chaired the St. Paul Park Economic Development Authority.

Franke owns Park Cafe and Franke's Corner Bar in St. Paul Park.

Minnesota House of Representatives
Franke was first elected to the Minnesota House of Representatives in 2016.

Personal life
Franke resides in St. Paul Park, Minnesota. He has two daughters.

Franke is a recovering substance addict and has been sober since 1998.

References

External links

1970 births
Living people
Republican Party members of the Minnesota House of Representatives
Mayors of places in Minnesota
21st-century American politicians